Davison High School is a public secondary school in Davison, Michigan, United States. It serves grades 9-12 for Davison Community Schools.

Demographics
The demographic breakdown of the 1,646 students enrolled in 2019-20 was:
Male - 51.4%
Female - 48.6%
Native American/Alaskan - 0.6%
Asian - 0.7%
Black - 3.5%
Hispanic - 4.6%
Native Hawaiian/Pacific islanders - 0.1%
White - 87.2%
Multiracial - 3.3%

34.5% of the students were eligible for free or reduced-cost lunch.

Athletics
Davison's Cardinals compete in the Saginaw Valley League. School colors are maroon and gold. The following Michigan High School Athletic Association (MHSAA) sanctioned sports are offered:

Baseball (boys) 
Basketball (girls and boys) 
Bowling (girls and boys) 
Girls state champion - 2012, 2013, 2014, 2016, 2017
Competitive cheerleading (girls) 
Cross country (girls and boys) 
Football (boys) 
State champion - 2019
Golf (girls and boys) 
Ice hockey (boys) 
Lacrosse (girls and boys) 
Soccer (girls and boys) 
Softball (girls) 
Swim and dive (girls and boys) 
Tennis (girls and boys) 
Track and field (girls and boys) 
Volleyball (girls) 
Wrestling (boys) 
State champion - 1980, 1981, 2000, 2002, 2003, 2004, 2005, 2006, 2021

References

External links

District website

Public high schools in Michigan
Schools in Genesee County, Michigan